Rajesh Krishnan is an Indian filmmaker, screenwriter, and producer predominantly known for his work on various humor-based television commercials. He was born in Mumbai, Maharashtra. He made his directorial debut with Lootcase, a comedy thriller, for which he was awarded the Filmfare Award for Best Debut Director, at the 66th Filmfare Awards.

Education 
Rajesh was born into a Palakkad Iyer family and grew up in Mumbai. He did his schooling at Vivek Vidyalaya School in Goregaon and studied bachelor's in commerce from Shri Chinai College of Commerce & Economics. He finished his Post Graduate studies in Advertising and Communications at Narsee Monjee Institute of Management Studies in 1995.

Career 
Rajesh started his career as a copywriter and worked with agencies, including Contract, Enterprise Nexus, and Ogilvy for five years. In 2007, he founded Soda Films along with producer Ameya Dahibavkar, an advertising production house based in Mumbai. Rajesh ventured into OTT space by directing Tripling, a drama series, which was created by The Viral Fever and awarded the Asian Television Awards in the year 2017. In 2020, he co-wrote and directed Kunal Khemu and Rasika Dugal starrer Lootcase for which he received two nominations for a Filmfare award for Best Story and Best Screenplay and also won an award for Best Debut Director on 27 March 2021.

Filmography

Director

Awards and nominations

References

External links 
 

Living people
Indian film directors
Film directors from Mumbai
Hindi-language film directors
21st-century Indian male writers
Indian male screenwriters
21st-century Indian film directors
Hindi screenwriters
Screenwriters from Mumbai
21st-century Indian screenwriters
Filmfare Awards winners
Year of birth missing (living people)